Albert Stinson (August 2, 1944 in Cleveland, Ohio – June 2, 1969) was an American jazz double-bassist.

Stinson learned to play piano, trombone, and tuba before settling on bass at age 14. After his graduation from John Muir High School in Pasadena, California in 1962, he began playing professionally in the early 1960s in Los Angeles, working with Terry Gibbs, Frank Rosolino, Chico Hamilton, and Charles Lloyd (1965). Later in the decade he worked with Larry Coryell, John Handy (1967), Miles Davis, Bobby Hutcherson (1967), and Gerald Wilson's Los Angeles-based big band. His ebullient personality, bright tone, and aggressive attack all contributed to his being nicknamed "Sparky".

Stinson died on tour of a drug overdose in 1969 at the age of 24. He never recorded as a leader but appears on Hamilton's Impulse! albums, Hutcherson's Blue Note album Oblique, and Handy's Koch Records album New View! He also appears on Clare Fischer's album Surging Ahead.

Discography
With Larry Coryell
 Coryell (Vanguard, 1969)

With Clare Fischer
 Surging Ahead (Pacific Jazz, 1963)

With Chico Hamilton
 Drumfusion (Columbia, 1962)
 Passin' Thru (Impulse!, 1962)
 A Different Journey (Reprise, 1963)
 Man from Two Worlds (Impulse!, 1963)
 Chic Chic Chico (Impulse!, 1965)
 El Chico (Impulse!, 1965)

With John Handy
 New View (Columbia, 1967)

With Bobby Hutcherson
 Oblique (Blue Note, 1967)

With Charles Lloyd
 Of Course, of Course (Columbia, 1965)
 Nirvana (Columbia, 1965)

With Joe Pass
 Catch Me! (Pacific Jazz, 1963)

References

[ Albert Stinson] at Allmusic

1944 births
1969 deaths
American jazz double-bassists
Male double-bassists
Musicians from Cleveland
Drug-related deaths in the United States
20th-century American musicians
Musicians from Pasadena, California
Jazz musicians from California
Jazz musicians from Ohio
20th-century double-bassists
20th-century American male musicians
American male jazz musicians